National Bureau of Statistics may refer to:

National Bureau of Statistics of China
National Bureau of Statistics of Moldova
National Bureau of Statistics, Nigeria
National Bureau of Statistics of Tanzania
Australian Bureau of Statistics

See also
 List of national and international statistical services